Heracleides (or Heraclides) of Cyme (fl. 350 B.C.) is a little-attested Greek historian who wrote a multivolume Persica, or history of Persia, not extant. Fragments from the Persica are preserved primarily by Athenaeus and it describes the customs of the Persian court. Heracleides was himself a subject of Persia under the Achaemenid Empire.

References

Further reading
For discussion of passages from the Persica, see Pierre Bryant, From Cyrus to Alexander: A History of the Persian Empire, translated by Peter Daniels (EIsenbrauns, 2002), limited preview online; search "Heraclides of Cyme"

External links
Josef Wiesehöfer, "Heracleides of Cyme," Encyclopaedia Iranica online

Historians of Iran
Ancient Greeks from the Achaemenid Empire
Classical-era Greek historians
Historians from ancient Anatolia
4th-century BC historians
Ancient Greek historians known only from secondary sources
Historians from the Achaemenid Empire
4th-century BC Greek people